Picnic Garden is a neighbourhood of South Kolkata, in West Bengal, India.

Location
Technically Picnic Garden is a locality in the Tiljala area, extending between Bartala More and VIP Nagar. For all practical purposes and in popular parlance, Picnic Garden refers to the area east of the Bondel Gate, off Ballygunge Place.

Transport
Buses ply along Picnic Garden Road and Chandra Nath Roy Road (C.N. Roy Road) in Picnic Garden.

Bus

Private Bus
 39 Picnic Garden - Kolkata High Court
 39A/2 VIP Bazar - Howrah Station
 42A Kasba Gas Turbine (Panchannagram) - Bichalighat

Mini Bus
 S118 VIP Bazar - Dey's Medical - Howrah Station
 S125 Kasba Gas Turbine (Panchannagram) - Dey's Medical - Howrah Station
 S128 Picnic Garden - Howrah Station
The auto-rickshaws running in three routes bring the important crossings of Ballygunge Phari, Gariahat and Park Circus within easy reach.

The construction of the Bondel Gate Rail Overbridge above the Kolkata Suburban Railway (Sealdah South Section), between Picnic Garden Road and Bondel Road, completed in 2006 after a long legal wrangle over land dispute, has eased up much of the traffic congestion. The proposed widening of Picnic Garden Road and G. S. Bose Road is yet to take place.

Train
Picnic Garden is served by the Sealdah South lines of the Kolkata Suburban Railway. Ballygunge Junction railway station and Park Circus railway station are 1.4 km and 1.8 km away from Colony Bazar respectively.

Culture
The Ras Purnima is celebrated with an elaborate fair and a circus show.

Sunil Nagar club won the prestigious Asian Paints Sharad Shamman "Best Durga Puja" award three times in 1992, 1995 and 1999.

References

Neighbourhoods in Kolkata